The 2020–21 Nevada Wolf Pack men's basketball team represented the University of Nevada, Reno during the 2020–21 NCAA Division I men's basketball season. The Wolf Pack, led by second-year head coach Steve Alford, played their home games at the Lawlor Events Center on their campus in Reno, Nevada as members of the Mountain West Conference (MW).

Previous season
The Wolf Pack finished the season 19–12, 12–6 in Mountain West play to finish in a three-way tie for second place. They lost in the quarterfinals of the Mountain West tournament to Wyoming.

Roster

Schedule and results

|-
!colspan=9 style=| Regular season

|-
!colspan=9 style=| Mountain West tournament

Source

References

Nevada Wolf Pack men's basketball seasons
Nevada
Nevada Wolf Pack
Nevada Wolf Pack